The Dewar Cup Finals  also known as the Dewar Cup London was an indoor tennis event held from 1968 through 1976. For the initial two years staged at the Crystal Palace and subsequently at the Royal Albert Hall, it served as the penultimate event of the Dewar Cup circuit of tournaments with the winners of each leg of the circuit qualifying for this final playoff competition.

Results

Men's singles

Men's doubles

Women's singles

Women's doubles

References

External links
 ATP results archive

Tennis tournaments in England
Defunct tennis tournaments in the United Kingdom